PJSC Sberbank (initially a contraction of ) is a Russian majority state-owned banking and financial services company headquartered in Moscow. It was called Sberbank of Russia until 2015 (currently: Sber). Sberbank has operations in several European nations, primarily post-Soviet countries.

By 2022, the bank accounted for about a third of all bank assets in Russia. The bank's rise since 1990s is in part due to its close connections to the Russian government.  it was the largest bank in Russia and Eastern Europe, and the third largest in Europe, ranked 60th in the world and first in central and Eastern Europe in The Bankers Top 1000 World Banks ranking. In the world ranking of public companies Forbes "Global 2000" Sberbank takes 51st place.

History

Early history
Sberbank's history goes back to Cancrin's financial reform of 1841, when a network of the first state-owned savings banks was created in Russian Empire. By the end of the 19th century, the network reached almost 4 thousand outlets with over 2 million depositors.

Since 1905, savings bank outlets became authorised to sell insurance. After 1910, savings banks started subsidising credit cooperation institutions and extending loans to small lenders. In 1915, savings bank outlets started accepting government securities for depositing.

Soviet savings banks system
After the October Revolution of 1917, the state savings banks system continued its activity and growth under the management of the Finance Ministry of the USSR as the State Labour Savings Banks System. From 1926, the saving bank outlets were used to pay wages to blue- and white-collar workers. The savings banks were used to distribute state lottery tickets and for the placement of state bonds with the population. The savings banks introduced wider services such as money transfers.

By late 1980s, the Soviet savings bank system had almost 80 thousand branches. As part of Perestroika reforms, in 1987 the savings bank outlets are reorganised into the Savings Bank of the USSR. Within the Savings bank of the USSR, separate savings banks were created in the Soviet Republics. Following the dissolution of the USSR, the former republican savings banks became state savings banks of the newly independent post-Soviet states.

In 1991, the Savings bank of the RSFSR has been reorganised into the Joint-Stock Commercial Savings Bank of the Russian Federation (Sberbank of Russia).

Sberbank of Russia
In post-Soviet Russia, Sberbank is the largest universal bank despite growing competition from private and other state-owned commercial banks. The bank has gradually expanded its international presence.

Since 2007, Sberbank is led by former economy minister Herman Gref who is a very close friend of Vladimir Putin.

Volksbank International acquisition, 2011
In 2011, Sberbank acquired Volksbank International AG from its shareholders Österreichische Volksbanken AG, BPCE, DZ Bank and WGZ Bank. The deal included all Volksbank assets - banks in Slovakia, Czech Republic, Hungary, Slovenia, Croatia, Ukraine, Serbia and Bosnia and Herzegovina, except for Volksbank Romania. The agreed price was €585 to €645 million, depending on Volksbank business performance in 2011. Volksbank's total assets excluding Romania was €9.4 billion in June 2011.

Denizbank acquisition, 2012
In June 2012 Sberbank bought the Turkish DenizBank for Turkish lira 6,469 billion (about EUR 2,821 billion or US$3.504 billion) from the lender Dexia, which in 2011 was "partly nationalized by the governments of France, Belgium and Luxembourg". The deal included DenizBank subsidiaries in Turkey, Austria and Russia.

US, EU, Switzerland, and Ukraine sanctions: 2014-2017
After the annexation of the Crimean Peninsula by Russia in 2014, the Obama administration imposed targeted sanctions on 12 September 2014, through the US Department of Treasury's Office of Foreign Assets Control (OFAC) by adding Sberbank and other entities to the Sectoral Sanctions Identifications (SSI) List. This was done in concert with 31 July 2014 addition of Sberbank to the European Union sanctions list. Sanctions consist of access restriction to the EU and US capital markets. After announcement of the sanctions, and by the end of July, Sberbank's market value had dropped the most market value among the world's major lenders plus investors moved $22 billion from Sberbank's market capitalization. Still, during the following year Sberbank's share price grew back 89%. Sberbank together with other Russian banks filed claims with the highest EU court to lift the punitive economic measures.

On 27 August 2014, Switzerland imposed sanctions on Sberbank and other Russian financial institutions.

On 22 December 2015, the United States imposed additional sanctions on Sberbank and its subsidiaries.

On 17 October 2016, Ukraine imposed sanctions against Sberbank Russia, Sberbank Leasing, and their payment systems Kolibri (Hummingbird), formerly Blitz.

On 15 March 2017, the president of Ukraine imposed sanctions on Sberbank (and other Russian state-owned banks operating in Ukraine: VTB Bank, BM Bank, Prominvestbank, and VS Bank) as part of its continued sanctions on Russia for its annexation of Crimea and involvement in the War in Donbas.

2017 sale of VS Bank to Tihipko
In December 2017, due to sanctions, Sberbank sold its Ukrainian subsidiary, VS Bank to Ukrainian businessman Serhiy Tihipko.

Credit cards: both issuer and payments
As of May 2016, Sberbank dominated the card payments business in Russia with over 61% of the market. Sberbank's competitors in the card business are VTB Bank, Alfa-Bank, Tinkoff Bank, and Gazprombank which combined only had a 29% of the card business market.

2022 sanctions
On 24 February 2022, as a result of the 2022 Russian invasion of Ukraine, US president Joe Biden announced sanctions against additional Russian individuals and companies, including new restrictions on Sberbank's operations, after which Sberbank's stock lost more than half of its value.

On 25 February 2022 the banking licence of Sberbank in Ukraine was revoked.

On 28 February 2022, Sberbank Europe was facing bankruptcy as a consequence of the sanctions. Deutsche Börse suspended trading of Sberbank stock. Two days later, Sberbank Europe declared that it was leaving the European market.

Visa and Mastercard suspended their activities in Russia at the beginning of March 2022. Cards of these systems issued by Russian banks  no longer worked outside of Russia, and all Visa cards issued outside of Russia no longer work within Russia.

On 1 April 2022 Sberbank CIB (UK) Limited went into Administration. The affairs of Sberbank CIB USA, Inc were also placed into wound down from April 2022. 

In April 2022, Apple and Google removed Sberbank mobile apps from their stores. The Android application can be downloaded from the bank's website, but iPhone users did not have this option. In August, the SBOL application appeared in the App Store. It does not formally belong to Sber, but it fully reproduces the functionality of the removed application. A week later, this app was also removed from App Store.

In July 2022 the EU imposed sanctions on Sberbank in relation to the 2022 Russian invasion of Ukraine.

Sberbank Switzerland was sold in September 2022 to m3 Groupe Holding SA and will trade as TradeXBank AG in future.

On 15 December 2022 Sberbank Europe AG banking licence lapsed and can no longer trade.  On 29 December 2022 Sberbank CIB (UK) Ltd and SIB (Cyprus) Limited were removed as member firms of the London Stock Exchange

Sberbank will be closing its office in the UAE in 2023 as a result of sanctions pressure.

Sanctioned by New Zealand.

Rebranding 2020 and "ecosystem" 
In 2020, Sberbank undertook a rebranding. In addition to changing the logo and legalizing the reduction “Sber”, the company announced the transformation of the bank into an “ecosystem”.
Sberbank decided to become "more than a bank" and began to develop various services, mainly digital: online cinema (Okko), music (SberSound), food delivery (SberMarket), cloud storage (SberDisk), taxi (Citymobil).

Initially, the "ecosystem" was built in partnership with the large Internet holding Mail.ru Group, for which a joint venture O2O (online-to-offline) Holding was created with a capital of about 100 billion rubles. However, in the spring of 2021, the parties decided to end cooperation due to disagreements over management methods and corporate culture.

Another component of the "ecosystem" is pharmacies. Having launched an online service, Sber Eapteka (e-drugstore), Sber soon decided to expand the business and open pharmacies in its own branches. It is assumed that purchases there will be more profitable due to targeted packaging of drugs, as well as the production of its own generics.

In the summer of 2021, Sberbank announced the implementation of the Sabbatical practice. Employees are allowed to take unpaid leave of up to a year - with the retention of their jobs (although this requires the consent of the immediate supervisor). It is also allowed to work remotely for three months a year.

Ownership 
The majority shareholder of Sberbank is the Russian National Wealth Fund managed by the Government of Russia (until 2020 the Central Bank of the Russian Federation), owning 50%+1 voting share of Sberbank's voting shares. The rest of the shares are dispersed among portfolio, private and other investors.

Russia's central bank cannot sell its stake without a change in Russia's laws.

Management 
The president and chief executive officer is Herman Gref, confirmed by the board of directors on 16 October 2007.

Sergei Gorkov joined Sberbank in November 2008 eventually becoming the head of the international operations and the senior vice chairman of the board from 10 October 2010, until 26 February 2016, when he left Sberbank to become the Chairman of Vnesheconombank (VEB). He greatly expanded Sberbank from operations in only two foreign countries, Kazakhstan (2006) and Ukraine (December 2007), to over twenty countries including Belarus (2009), Germany (2009), China (2010), India (September 2010), Switzerland (31 December 2011), Austria (acquisition of Volksbank International AG on 15 February 2012; changed name to Sberbank Europe AG on 1 November 2012, with locations in Austria, Bosnia and Herzegovina, Croatia, Czech Republic, Hungary, Slovakia, Slovenia, Serbia, Ukraine, and Germany), Bosnia-Herzegovina (20 February 2013), Hungary (31 December 2011; 1 November 2013, as Sberbank Hungary Ltd), Croatia (February 2012), Czech Republic (20 February 2013), Slovenia (28 January 2013), Serbia (24 December 2012), Slovakia (15 February 2013), and Turkey (acquisition of DenizBank in September 2012). Following Gorkov's departure, Svetlana Alekseyevna Sagaydak became the new Senior Vice Chairman of the Board.

The chairman of the supervisory board of Sberbank (since April 2021) is Anton Siluanov, Minister of Finance of Russia.

Formerly from 2003 to 2013 the head of RIA Novosti and from 2006 to 2016 its editor in chief, Svetlana Mironyuk is a vice-president and the head of marketing and communications since 1 February 2016.

In February 2022, Sverbank announced foundation of its own e-commerce holding, headed by its former top-manager Lev Khasis but in a week on Feb 22,2022 he left Sberbank.

Operations 

As of 2015 the bank had about 16,500 offices with over 250,000 employees. According to own estimates, the bank had over 137 million retail clients and over 1.1 million corporate clients in its 22 countries of presence.

As of August 2015 it accounted for 28.6% of aggregate banking assets, calling itself "the circulatory system of the Russian economy","key lender to the Russian economy and the biggest receiver of deposits".

Within Russia, Sberbank is structured into several regional divisions (territorial banks):

International presence 

The 19 August 2021 Supreme Court of Ukraine ruling forbids the daughter of the Russian Sberbank in Ukraine to use the trademark "Sberbank" since it ruled that Oschadbank is the sole legal owner of the trademark "Sberbank" in Ukraine.

In November 2021, aiming to focus on priority markets, Sberbank Europe AG sold associated banks in Bosnia and Herzegovina (Sberbank a.d. Banja LuKa and Sberbank BH d.d. Sarajevo), in Croatia (Sberbank d.d.), in Hungary (Sberbank Magyarorszag Zrt.), in Serbia (Sberbank Srbija a.d. Beograd) and in Slovenia (Sberbank banka d.d.) to Serbian MK Group for about 500 million Euros.

Sponsorship 

Sberbank sponsors sports and charity events in various regions of Russia, as well as educational projects including projects developing financial literacy.

Controversies

Savings freezing

Sberbank is the successor of Soviet Saving Banks (as it name implies), whose assets belonged to the state. During Russia's transition to a market economy in the 1990s, in which these assets were sold, Sberbank provided no guarantee for citizens' deposits. This resulted in a landslide depreciation, which in turn led to severe discontent among the Russian population. Since 1996, partial compensation for investors' losses has been offered. However, until 2003 this only applied to state-owned banks such as Sberbank, giving them an unfair advantage over fully private banks.

The law of 1995 assumed that in 2003 the repayment of debts to the population would begin, taking into account the real value of the ruble at the current moment. However, for 20 years, the start of payments was regularly postponed. As of 2022, the full repayment of the debt would cost the state almost 200 trillion rubles. In the fall of 2022, the government introduced a bill on a new delay - until 2026.

Low level of service in the early 2000s
In the early 2000s, Sberbank was repeatedly blamed for poor service. In subsequent years, Sberbank introduced new services and improved the quality of some of its existing ones. By the mid-2010s, the bank was reportedly among the market leaders with regards to quality of client services, such as services for retail depositors, premium services and several others.

Laundering stolen money accusations, Prevezon Holdings

Owned by Denis Katsyv, Prevezon Holdings, represented by Natalia Vladimirovna Veselnitskaya and Louis Freeh, paid $6 million to resolve the claim without admitting any crime which subsequently led to all charges being dropped by the Justice Department in the summer of 2017.

Pavlovgranite case 
In United States court, Sergey P. Poymanov, a Voronezh-based businessman, sued Sberbank, several of its subsidiaries and executives, and a business rival for $750 million, claiming that a valuable granite gravel quarry he owned was illegally bankrupted and seized by the bank in a corporate raid in 2012. Sberbank says it took the quarry as collateral after Mr. Poymanov failed to repay a loan. Sberbank is retaining Marc Kasowitz for this court case.

In January 2017 Herman Gref, a bank chief executive, has personally commented on Poymanov case, referring to the latter as a "fraudster" and accusing him of not paying loands and debts, and that Poymanov is charged with a felony. He said that Poymanov "extracted" a lot of money out of the company and that he was offered with a restructuring of his loans but allegedly refused.

Poymanov was subsequently charged with a bunch of misdemeanors and arrested on May 24, 2017, by Russian police who then subjected him to harsh pretrial detention at a notoriously rough Moscow jail, Matrosskaya Tishina, which is the same jail where Magnitsky died. He was charged with alleged embezzlement of company's money amounting to almost 1 billion rubles (about $13 billion) as a part of Bankruptcy fraud.

Ukrainian sanctions and vandalism of Sberbank property

In April 2014, several Ukrainian officials accused Sberbank of funding the 2014 pro-Russian unrest in Ukraine, including alleged terrorism. The bank denied any involvement in the financing of illegal activities on Ukrainian territory, which was later confirmed by an examination carried out by the National Bank of Ukraine.

"It is another instance of aggressive nationalism of neo-Nazi dogma that is gathering momentum in Ukraine and obviously enjoys support of official authorities of the country," the Russian foreign ministry stated.

15 March 2017, the president of Ukraine imposed sanctions on Sberbank (and other Russian state-owned banks operating in Ukraine: VTB Bank, BM Bank, Prominvestbank, and ) as part of its continued sanctions on Russia for its annexation of Crimea and involvement in the War in Donbas. Since then, Sberbank's Ukrainian subsidiary, VS Bank, has been put on sale. But  it has been unsuccessfully trying to sell the asset after the National Bank of Ukraine blocked the sale of the bank due to a "failure to provide the necessary and sufficient documents to carry out checks on the investors in compliance with Ukrainian law." In 2017 Sberbank was reported to be waiting for approval from the National Bank of Ukraine to sell its Ukrainian subsidiaries. "Everything is prepared on our side. The question is whether we will be given a permission to sell or not by Ukrainian authorities," Herman Gref who is the chairman of Sberbank said on the World Economic Forum held in Davos in January 2018. On 13 December 2017, Sberbank sold another subsidiary, VS Bank, to a Ukrainian banker, former PrivatBank chairman Serhiy Tihipko.

Troika Laundromat accusation in Lithuania

In March 2019, the Troika Laundromat was exposed as an international money laundering network involving the Troika Dialog which is an investment bank that has been merged with the Sberbank's subsidiary Sberbank CIB.

2019 data breach 
In October 2019, it was revealed that analysts from cybersecurity firm DeviceLock had shared information about a large Sberbank data breach with the newspaper, the Kommersant. The personal information of up to 60 million Sberbank credit cards had been offered for sale on the black market. It was the largest data breach to have taken place in Russian banking.

See also 

 Banking in Russia
 Sberkassa
 VTB Bank

Explanatory notes

References

External links

 
 Sberbank BIC Codes

 
1841 establishments in the Russian Empire
Banks established in 1841
Banks of Russia
Banks of the Soviet Union
Companies based in Moscow
Companies listed on the Moscow Exchange
Government-owned banks
Government-owned companies of Russia
Russian brands
Russian entities subject to the U.S. Department of the Treasury sanctions
Soviet brands